The "Five Bridges Suite" is a modern piece of music, written in the 1960s, combining classical music and jazz. Written about the UK city of Newcastle upon Tyne, it was released as an album by the Nice as Five Bridges, which achieved the number two position in the UK album charts. In the Q & Mojo Classic Special Edition Pink Floyd & The Story of Prog Rock, the album came No. 29 in its list of "40 Cosmic Rock Albums".

History 

The work was commissioned for the Newcastle Arts Festival and premiered with a full orchestra conducted by Joseph Eger on 10 October 1969 (the recorded version is from 17 October in Croydon's Fairfield Halls). The title refers to the city's five bridges spanning the River Tyne (two more have since been built over the river, including the Gateshead Millennium Bridge), and the album cover, by Hipgnosis, features an image of the Tyne Bridge.

The five movements are:
"Fantasia" – orchestra with solo piano interludes by Keith Emerson
"Second Bridge" – trio without orchestra
"Chorale" – Lee Jackson's vocals with orchestra, alternating with piano trio interludes
"High Level Fugue" – piano with accompanying cymbals
"Finale" – a restating of the Second Bridge with additional jazz horn players.

Emerson used Walter Piston's well-known textbook on orchestration for the work. Emerson credits Friedrich Gulda for inspiring the High Level Fugue, which uses jazz figures in the strict classical form.

Also included on the Five Bridges album were live performances from the same Fairfield Hall concert of the Sibelius Intermezzo and a movement from Tchaikovsky's Pathetique Symphony. Both involved the orchestra playing the "straight" music juxtaposed with the trio's interpretations. Newly discovered material from this concert was later issued as part of a 3-CD set entitled Here Come The Nice.

The Five Bridges album also included a blending of Bob Dylan's "Country Pie" with Bach's "Brandenburg Concerto No. 6" (with a quote of Coleman Hawkins' jazz line "Rifftide" as well) and a studio recording of the original "One of Those People".

Reception

Paul Stump's 1997 History of Progressive Rock called the album "ill-conceived", commenting that the orchestrated pieces are poorly meshed, with the rock band and orchestra playing either separately (as on the first few movements of "The Five Bridges Suite") or such that "The textures of neither genre are properly utilized; it is like listening to two transistor radios simultaneously playing ..." However, he cited the final two tracks as among the Nice's best works, elaborating that "['One of Those People'] perhaps illustrates the Nice's real gift: to reduce pop forms to their constituent parts, alter their horizontal profile by cutting down paragraphs and overturning expected progression of chords and rhythm, which gives Emerson just as much of a chance to display his considerable technique without recourse to braggadocio." Mike DeGagne's retrospective review for Allmusic, in contrast, argued that "Intermezzo" and "Pathetique" "are marvelous examples of classical and rock commingling" and that throughout the album, "Each example of genre merging is pristine and fluid, making the actual overlapping of multiple styles completely transparent."

Track listing

Side one
"The Five Bridges Suite" (Keith Emerson, Lee Jackson) – 18:06
"Fantasia 1st Bridge"
"2nd Bridge"
"Chorale 3rd Bridge"
"High Level Fugue 4th Bridge"
"Finale 5th Bridge"

Side two
"Intermezzo 'Karelia Suite'" (Sibelius, Arr. Emerson, Joseph Eger) – 9:01
"Pathetique (Symphony No. 6, 3rd Movement)" (Tchaikovsky, Arr. Emerson, Joseph Eger) – 9:23
"Country Pie/Brandenburg Concerto No. 6" (Bob Dylan, Johann Sebastian Bach) – 5:40
"One of Those People" (Emerson, Jackson) – 3:08

Charts

Personnel
The Nice
 Brian Davison – drums, percussion
 Keith Emerson – keyboards
 Lee Jackson – vocals, bass guitar

with:
 Joe Harriott – saxophone
 Peter King – saxophone
 Chris Pyne – trombone
 Alan Skidmore – saxophone
 John Warren
 Kenny Wheeler – trumpet, flugelhorn
  The Sinfonia Of London orchestra conducted by Joseph Eger

References

1970 albums
Albums with cover art by Hipgnosis
Albums with cover art by Storm Thorgerson
The Nice albums
Charisma Records albums
Mercury Records albums
Philips Records albums
Albums produced by Brian Davison (drummer)
Albums produced by Keith Emerson
Albums produced by Lee Jackson (bassist)
Suites (music)